Ernst Kuno Berthold Fischer (23 July 1824 – 5 July 1907) was a German philosopher, a historian of philosophy and a critic.

Biography

After studying philosophy at Leipzig and Halle,
became a privatdocent at Heidelberg in 1850. The Baden government in 1853 laid an embargo on his teaching owing to his liberal ideas, but the effect of this was to rouse considerable sympathy for his views, and in 1856 he obtained a professorship at Jena, where he soon acquired great influence by the dignity of his personal character. In 1872, on Eduard Zeller's move to Berlin, Fischer succeeded him as professor of philosophy and the history of modern German literature at Heidelberg.

He was a brilliant lecturer and possessed a remarkable gift for clear exposition. His fame rests primarily on his work as a historian and commentator of philosophy. As far as his philosophical views were concerned, he was, generally speaking, a follower of the Hegelian school. His writings in this direction, especially his interpretation of Kant, involved him in a quarrel with F. A. Trendelenburg, professor of philosophy at the University of Berlin, and his followers.  In 1860, Fischer's Kants Leben und die Grundlagen seiner Lehre (Kant's life and the foundations of his doctrine) lent the first real impulse to the so-called “return to Kant.”

In honor of his 80th birthday, celebrated in 1904, Otto Liebmann, Wilhelm Wundt, Theodor Lipps and others published Die Philosophie im Beginn des 20. Jahrhunderts. Festschrift für Kuno Fischer (Heidelberg, 1907).

Philosophy
One of Fischer's most significant and lasting contributions to philosophy was the use of the empiricism/rationalism distinction in categorising philosophers, particularly those of the 17th and 18th centuries. These include John Locke, George Berkeley and David Hume in the empiricist category and René Descartes, Baruch Spinoza and G.W. Leibniz in the rationalist category. Empiricism, it is said, claims that human knowledge is derived from sensation, i.e. experience, while rationalism claims that certain knowledge can be acquired before experience through pure principles. Although influential, in more recent times this distinction has been questioned as anachronistic in its failure to represent precisely the exact claims and methodologies of the philosophers it categorises.

Reception
Kuno Fischer's History of Modern Philosophy had a strong impact on Friedrich Nietzsche and his view on modern philosophy, particularly regarding Spinoza. Frege and W. Somerset Maugham were amongst his students.

Hermann Weyl, writing about pre-WWII academic life in Germany, told the following anecdote about Fischer:

A little anecdote of German university life in the nineties may illustrate the point.  Kuno Fischer, a second-rate philosopher at Heidelberg, was one day disturbed by the noise of workers who were putting in new cobblestones in the street before his house.  He had at that time been offered a professorship in Berlin.  So he opened his window and shouted to the workmen, "If you don't stop that noise at once, I'll accept the call to Berlin".  Whereupon the foreman ran to the mayor, he summoned the Stadtbaumeister and they decided to postpone repair of the street until after the beginning of the academic vacation.

Works
 De Parmenide Platonico. Stuttgart (thesis, 1847, online).
 Diotima. Die Idee des Schönen (Diotima, the idea of the beautiful; Pforzheim, 1849) (online) 
 System der Logik und Metaphysik oder Wissenschaftslehre (System of logic and metaphysics, or doctrine of knowledge; 1852) (online)
 Das Interdict meiner Vorlesungen (The prohibition of my lectures; Mannheim, 1854)
 1854: Die Apologie meiner Lehre nebst Replik auf die „Abfertigung“ des Herrn Schenkel (online) 
 Geschichte der neuern Philosophie (History of modern philosophy; 6 vols., Stuttgart-Mannheim-Heidelberg, 1854–77; new edition, Heidelberg, 1897–1901) This is considered by some to be his greatest work.  It is written in the form of monographs on Descartes, Kant, Fichte, Schelling and other great philosophers down to Schopenhauer: 
 erster Band: Descartes und seine Schule (1. Teil online, 2. Teil online) 
 zweiter Band: Leibniz und seine Schule (online)  
 dritter Band: Immanuel Kant und seine Lehre (online) 
 vierter Band: Kant's System der reinen Vernunft (online: 2. Aufl. 1869, 3. neu bearb. Aufl. 1882, 4. ed. 1899) 
 fünfter Band: Fichte und seine Vorgänger (online) 
 achter Band: Hegels Leben, Werke und Lehre (online: part 1 (1901), part 2 (1901))  
 neunter Band: Schopenhauers Leben, Werke und Lehre (online (Jubiläumsausgabe 1898)) 
 Franz Baco von Verona (Leipzig, 1856 (2nd edition 1875); translated into English by J. Oxenford, London, 1857)
 Schiller als Philosoph (Frankfurt am Main, 1858; 2nd ed. 1891-92)
 Kants Leben und die Grundlagen seiner Lehre (Mannheim, 1860)
 Akademische Reden: J. G. Fichte; Die beiden Kantischen Schulen in Jena (The two schools of Kant in Jena; Stuttgart, 1862)
 Lessings “Nathan der Weise” (Stuttgart, 1864; translated into English by Ellen Frothingham, New York, 1868)
 Baruch Spinozas Leben und Charakter (Heidelberg, 1865; translated into English by F. Schmidt, Edinburgh, 1882)
 System der reinen Vernunft auf Grund der Vernunftkritik (1866)
 Shakespeares Charakterentwickelung Richards III (Character development of Shakespeare's Richard III; Heidelberg, 1868)
 Über die Entstehung und die Entwickelungsformen des Witzes (The origins and modes of development of wit; Heidelberg, 1871)
 Schellings Leben, Werke und Lehre (Heidelberg, [1872] - taken from the Fourth Edition, issued in monographic series, Geschichte der Neuern Philosophie von Kudo Fischer, published in Heidelberg, 1923 - on the work of German philosopher Friedrich Wilhelm Joseph Schelling)
 Kritik der Kantischen Philosophie (Munich, 1883; translated into English by W. S. Hough, London 1888)
 Goethe-Schriften (8 vols., Heidelberg, 1888–96)
 Kleine Schriften (Heidelberg, 1888–98)
 Schiller-Schriften (2 vols., Heidelberg, 1891)
 Philosophische Schriften (3 parts, Heidelberg, 1891–92)
 Hegels Leben und Werke (Heidelberg, 1911)

Other translations of his works are:
 A Commentary of Kant's "Critic of Pure Reason" (trans. by J. P. Mahaffy, London-Dublin, 1866; online) 
 Descartes and his School (trans. by John P. Gordy, New York, 1887)

See also
 Fischer–Trendelenburg debate

Notes

References

 This work in turn cites:
 Alexander, A. B. D., “Kuno Fischer. An Estimate of his Life and Work” (in Journal of Philosophy, Psychology and Scientific Methods, Vol. V, p. 57, New York, 1908)
 Falkenheim, H., Kuno Fischer und die Litterar-Historische Methode (Berlin, 1892)
 Goehring, H., “Von Kuno Fischers Geistesart” (in Pädagogisches Magazin, Heft 317, Langensalza, 1907)
 Petsch, R., “Kuno Fischer” (in Deutsche Shakespeare Gesellschaft Jahrbuch, Vol. XLIV, p. 189, Berlin, 1908)
 Trendelenburg, F. A., Kuno Fischer und sein Kant (Leipzig 1869)
 Vaihinger, H., “Der Streit zwischen Trendelenburg und Fischer” (in Commentar zu Kants “Kritik der Reinen Vernunft”, Vol. II, pp. 290 and 545, Stuttgart, 1882–92)
 Windelband, W., Kuno Fischer (Heidelberg 1907)

External links

 
 
 Short German text
 Francis Bacon of Verulam. Realistic Philosophy and its Age by Kuno Fischer, translated from the German by John Oxenford. London, 1857 

1824 births
1907 deaths
19th-century philosophers
19th-century German philosophers
19th-century German people
People from the Province of Silesia
Leipzig University alumni
Martin Luther University of Halle-Wittenberg alumni
Academic staff of Heidelberg University
Academic staff of the University of Jena
German historians of philosophy
19th-century German writers
19th-century German male writers
German male non-fiction writers
Spinoza scholars